James J. Gallagher (June 7, 1901 – October 7, 1971) was a Scottish American soccer right wing midfielder who spent eleven seasons in the American Soccer League.  He was a member of the U.S. soccer teams at the 1930 FIFA World Cup and 1934 FIFA World Cup. Gallagher was inducted into the National Soccer Hall of Fame in 1986.

Youth
Gallagher moved to the U.S. with his mother when he was twelve, settling in New York City.  When he was seventeen, he signed with Tebo Yacht Basin F.C. of the New York State League. In 1920, Tebo lost to Brooklyn Robins Dry Dock in the third round of the National Challenge Cup.  However, the team won the 1920-1921 league and league cup titles.

Professional career
In 1921, Gallagher, and team mate Albert Mitchell, moved to J&P Coats of the newly formed American Soccer League (ASL), spending two seasons with the team. J&P Coats won the 1922-1923 league title but lost in the semifinals of the 1923 National Challenge Cup to eventual winner Paterson F.C.

In 1923, Gallagher began the 1923-1924 season with the Fall River Marksmen but moved to the New York Giants after only two games. In the summer of 1924, he moved to Fleisher Yarn. After one season, he transferred to Indiana Flooring, a new team to the league which played in the New York City area. In 1927, Charles Stoneham, bought Indiana Flooring and changed the team's name to the New York Nationals. After three season under that name, Stoneham changed it again, this time to the New York Giants in 1930. However, while still using the moniker "Nationals", the team won both the ASL league and cup (Lewis Cup) titles.

As the Giants, the team won the 1931-1932 ASL championship.  By that time, the league was collapsing. The Giants lasted through the spring 1932 season before folding.  It appears that at that time, Gallagher moved to the New York Field Club.  He then played for Malta United on Long Island through at least December 1933.  He then moved west to sign with Cleveland Slavia. He remained with them through at least 1934 as he was listed with Slavia on the 1934 World Cup roster. At some point, he moved to Cleveland Graphite Bronze where he finished his career.

When Gallagher left the ASL to move to Cleveland, he had played a total of 346 regular and post season games. That was third on the U.S. list until Chris Henderson passed him in 2006.

National and Olympic teams
Gallagher earned five caps with the U.S. national team. He played in all three U.S. games at the 1930 FIFA World Cup as the U.S. made it to the semifinals.  He also played a friendly with Brazil following the cup.  His last game with the national team came in the U.S. victory over Mexico on May 24, 1934 which qualified the U.S. for the 1934 FIFA World Cup finals.  He is often confused with another Jimmy Gallagher, who played for the U.S. at the 1928 Olympics in Amsterdam.

Personal
In 1937 Gallagher married Marie Coughlin. They went on to have two daughters, Rita Gallager (Weber) and Carol Gallagher (Such). He has 11 grandchildren and 23 great grandchildren.

Gallagher was inducted into the National Soccer Hall of Fame in 1986.

See also
List of United States men's international soccer players born outside the United States

References

External links
 Soccer Hall of Fame profile

1901 births
1971 deaths
1930 FIFA World Cup players
Cleveland Slavia players
British emigrants to the United States
United States men's international soccer players
Tebo Yacht Basin F.C. players
American Soccer League (1921–1933) players
J&P Coats players
Fall River Marksmen players
Fleisher Yarn players
Indiana Flooring players
New York Nationals (ASL) players
New York Giants (soccer, 1930–1932) players
New York Giants (soccer) players
1934 FIFA World Cup players
National Soccer Hall of Fame members
Sportspeople from Kirkintilloch
American soccer players
Association football midfielders